"Star-crossed" is a phrase describing a pair of lovers whose relationship is often thwarted by outside forces.

Star-crossed or starcrossed may also refer to:

Film and television
 Starcrossed (2005 film), an independent short film
 Starcrossed (2014 film), a film starring Mischa Barton
 Starcrossed, a 1985 made-for-TV film starring James Spader
 Star-Crossed (TV series), a 2014 television series on The CW
 "Star-Crossed" (Grimm), a 2016 episode of American television series Grimm
 "Star-Crossed" (Supergirl) an episode of the television series Supergirl
 "Star-Crossed" (Tru Calling), an episode of the television series Tru Calling
 "Starcrossed" (Justice League episode), a three-part episode of the animated television series Justice League
 Starcrossed, a TV show in the film A Dog's Breakfast

Literature
 Star Crossed (comics), a comic book limited series published by the DC Comics imprint, Helix
 Starcrossed (novel), a 2011 novel by Josephine Angelini
 The Starcrossed, a 1975 science fiction novel by Ben Bova
 Starcrossed, a science fiction novel by Brenda Hiatt

Music
 Star-Crossed (album), a 2021 album by Kacey Musgraves and the title song
 Starcrossed, a 2000 album by Maggie Reilly
 "Starcrossed" (song), a 2004 single by the Irish alternative rock group Ash
 Star crossed, a song from the 2007 album Scary Kids Scaring Kids

Art
 Star-Crossed, a public sculpture by Nancy Holt

See also
 Starcross, a riverside village in Devon, England
 Starcross (video game), a 1982 interactive fiction game
 Starcross (novel), a 2007 young adult novel by Philip Reeve
 Star-crossed lovers (disambiguation)